Michael Doe may refer to:

Michael Doe (bishop) (born 1947), British bishop
Michael Doe (businessman) (died 1990), British–Liberian businessman